In mathematics, an analytic semigroup is particular kind of strongly continuous semigroup.  Analytic semigroups are used in the solution of partial differential equations; compared to strongly continuous semigroups, analytic semigroups provide better regularity of solutions to initial value problems, better results concerning perturbations of the infinitesimal generator, and a relationship between the type of the semigroup and the spectrum of the infinitesimal generator.

Definition

Let Γ(t) = exp(At) be a strongly continuous one-parameter semigroup on a Banach space (X, ||·||) with infinitesimal generator A.  Γ is said to be an analytic semigroup if

 for some 0 < θ < π/&hairsp;2, the continuous linear operator exp(At) : X → X can be extended to t ∈ Δθ&hairsp;,

and the usual semigroup conditions hold for s, t ∈ Δθ&hairsp;: exp(A0) = id, exp(A(t + s)) = exp(At) exp(As), and, for each x ∈ X, exp(At)x is continuous in t;

 and, for all t ∈ Δθ \ {0}, exp(At) is analytic in t in the sense of the uniform operator topology.

Characterization

The infinitesimal generators of analytic semigroups have the following characterization:

A closed, densely defined linear operator A on a Banach space X is the generator of an analytic semigroup if and only if there exists an ω ∈ R such that the half-plane Re(λ) > ω is contained in the resolvent set of A and, moreover, there is a constant C such that

for Re(λ) > ω and where  is the resolvent of the operator A. Such operators are called sectorial. If this is the case, then the resolvent set actually contains a sector of the form

for some δ > 0, and an analogous resolvent estimate holds in this sector.  Moreover, the semigroup is represented by

where γ is any curve from e−iθ∞ to e+iθ∞ such that γ lies entirely in the sector

with π/&hairsp;2 < θ < π/&hairsp;2 + δ.

References

 

Functional analysis
Partial differential equations
Semigroup theory